Methylenedioxybenzylamphetamine, abbreviated MDBZ, and systematically named 3,4-methylenedioxy-N-benzylamphetamine, is a psychedelic drug. It is the N-benzyl derivative of 3,4-methylenedioxyamphetamine (MDA). MDBZ was first synthesized by Alexander Shulgin. In his book PiHKAL (Phenethylamines i Have Known And Loved), the minimum dosage is listed as 150 mg, and the duration unknown. Very few data exist about the pharmacological properties, metabolism, and toxicity of MDBZ.

In an episode of the British spoof documentary TV show Brass Eye, David Amess MP was fooled into recording a warning against a fictitious new drug called "cake". When asked a parliamentary question about it, the Home Office incorrectly assumed Amess was referring to MDBZ.

Legality

United Kingdom
MDBZ is a Class A drug in the Drugs controlled by the UK Misuse of Drugs Act.

See also 
 Benzphetamine
 Benzylone
 Phenethylamine

References

External links 
 MDBZ entry in PiHKAL
 MDBZ entry in PiHKAL • info

Substituted amphetamines
Benzodioxoles